"Falling" is the second single released from Montell Jordan's second album, More.... Like the previous single, "I Like", "Falling" was co-produced by Derick "D Man" McEleveen and James Earl Jones, who sampled MC Eiht's "Streiht Up Menace". "Falling" is the most successful of the three singles, making it to 18 on the Billboard Hot 100, and was certified gold on December 3, 1996 for individual sales of 500,000 copies. The official remix featured a guest appearance from rapper, Flesh-n-Bone.

Single track listing

A-Side
"Falling" (LP Version)    
"Falling" (Instrumental)

B-Side
"I Like" (Remix)   
"Falling" (A Cappella)

Charts and certifications

Weekly charts

Year-end charts

Certifications

References

1996 singles
Montell Jordan songs
Songs written by Montell Jordan
1996 songs
Def Jam Recordings singles
Contemporary R&B ballads